Wilfrid John Hall CMG MC (13 December 1892 – 13 January 1965) was a British entomologist. The son of John Richard Clark Hall, he was director of the Commonwealth Institute of Entomology 1946–1958, and president of the Royal Entomological Society 1955–1956.

References 

Companions of the Order of St Michael and St George
Recipients of the Military Cross
1892 births
1965 deaths